The 2004 Bridgestone 400 was the twelfth round of the 2004 Bridgestone Presents the Champ Car World Series Powered by Ford season, held on September 25, 2004 at the Las Vegas Motor Speedway in Las Vegas, Nevada.  Patrick Carpentier won the pole, the fifth and final pole of his Champ Car career.  Sébastien Bourdais won the race.

Qualifying results

Race

* Alex Tagliani was dropped from 14th to 16th in the final standings and lost his bonus point for leading a lap as a penalty for ignoring a black flag during the race.

Caution flags

Notes

 New Race Lap Record Bruno Junqueira 26.166
 New Race Record Sébastien Bourdais 1:29:01.061
 Average Speed 167.832 mph

Championship standings after the race

Drivers' Championship standings

 Note: Only the top five positions are included.

References

External links
 Full Weekend Times & Results
 Qualifying Results
 Race Box Score

Las Vegas
Bridgestone 400
Motorsport in Las Vegas
Bridgestone 400 2004